The Kahars are a community of palanquin bearers originating from the Gangatic region.

Kahars are present in most parts of India, but are concentrated in North India. They are found mainly in West Uttar Pradesh, in Sarsawa, Saharanpur, Farrukhabad, Kanpur, Muzaffarnagar, Shahjahanpur, Sultanpur, Faizabad, Jaunpur and Ambedkar Nagar districts of Uttar Pradesh and most parts of Bihar and West Bengal. They were engaged to officiate at the various holy occasions which occur along the banks of the Ganges river.

In Rajasthan, the Kahars have three sub-divisions, the Budana and Turaha. These sub-divisions consist of clans, the main ones being the Pindwal, Bamnawat, Katariya, Bilawat, Kashyap and Oatasaniya. The origins of most of these sub-divisions are rooted in Rajasthan.

Classification
They are currently classified as Other Backward Class in all state.

References

Social groups of Uttar Pradesh
Social groups of Bihar
Social groups of Madhya Pradesh
Social groups of Rajasthan
Fishing castes
Other Backward Classes
Social groups of Karnataka
Social groups of Maharashtra
Social groups of West Bengal